Zdeněk Kuba (born 4 March 1948) is a Czech rower. He competed at the 1968 Summer Olympics and the 1972 Summer Olympics.

References

External links
 

1948 births
Living people
Czech male rowers
Olympic rowers of Czechoslovakia
Rowers at the 1968 Summer Olympics
Rowers at the 1972 Summer Olympics
People from Břeclav
Sportspeople from the South Moravian Region